Diminished tuning is a system of choosing the reeds for a diatonic wind instrument (such as a harmonica or accordion) in which the blow notes repeat a sequence of
C E♭ F♯ A
and draw notes follow a repeating sequence of
D F G♯ B
(perhaps shifted to begin with E♭ and F, with F♯ and G♯, or with A and B).

For example:

{| class="wikitable" style="text-align:center"
! hole
||  1 ||  2 ||  3 ||  4 ||  5 ||  6 ||  7 ||  8 ||  9 || 10 || 11 || 12
|-
! blow note
|| C || E || F || A || C || E || F || A || C || E || F || A
|-
! draw note
|| D || F  || G♯ || B || D || F  || G♯ || B || D || F  || G♯ || B
|}

See also 
Augmented tuning
Country tuning
Harmonic minor tuning
Major seventh tuning
Melody Maker tuning
Natural minor tuning
Paddy Richter tuning
Richter tuning
Solo tuning

References

Musical tuning